Khaliya Bugyal is a Bugyal (Himalayan Alpine Meadow) in the Pithoragarh district of Uttarakhand. Khaliya Bugyal is a trekking and skiing destination. The Bugyal has the highest elevation of 3709m and is around 16 km from Munsiyari. Khaliya Bugyal is situated between the snowy peaks and the forests of Deodar, Pine and Rhododendrons.

The best time to visit the Khaliya Bugyal is either in the Spring or the Winters. In springs, there is greenery of the grasslands and red and pink rhododendron. The Khaliya Bugyal is a destination for nature photographers and bird watchers. In winters, the bugyal turns into snow land and skiing activities take place at Khaliya Bugyal organised by Uttarakhand Tourism Development Board. The Trek to Khaliya Bugyal starts from Munsiyari and is a 5-6 km trek from its starting point. One can see views of Kumaon Himalayas including Nanda Kot and Panchachuli peaks from Khaliya Bugyal.

References

Geography of Pithoragarh district
Montane grasslands and shrublands